Glauber de Medeiros Braga (born 26 June 1982) is a Brazilian politician. He has spent his political career representing Rio de Janeiro, having served as federal deputy representative since 2011.

Personal life
Braga is the son of Roberto Ricardo Braga and Maria da Saudade Medeiros Braga. His mother was a noted left-wing politician. Braga has described Carlos Marighella, Plínio de Arruda Sampaio, Luís Carlos Prestes, Olga Benário Prestes, and Zumbi as his role models.

In January 2020, Braga publicly announced that he was in a relationship with Sâmia Bomfim, federal deputy for the PSOL of São Paulo. In December 2020, Bomfim announced she was pregnant with the couples' first child, Hugo.

Political career
Braga voted against the impeachment motion of then-president Dilma Rousseff. Braga voted in opposition to the 2017 Brazilian labor reform, and would vote in favor of opening a corruption investigation into Rousseff's successor Michel Temer.

Braga was a vocal opponent of law Nº 13,429/2017, signed by Temer which allowed companies to hire outsourced employees from outside the company for primary activities. Braga said "it's not about granting rights to the outsourced worker. It's about outsourcing all and any activity of the labor market, worsening labor relations and worsening rights".

In February 2020 Braga got into an argument with justice minister and judge Sergio Moro, as the two publicly traded insults in the Chamber of deputies. Braga called "militant henchman" who was defending Flávio Bolsonaro from corruption allegations while Moro claimed Braga was unqualified and that the PSOL party was the one protecting criminals. Éder Mauro then insulted Braga's mother before the chairman Marcelo Ramos decided to call off the hearing.

References

1982 births
Living people
People from Nova Friburgo
Brazilian Socialist Party politicians
Socialism and Liberty Party politicians
Members of the Chamber of Deputies (Brazil) from Rio de Janeiro (state)